Gymnocypris potanini is a species of cyprinid fish endemic to China.

Named in honor of Grigory Nikolayaevich Potanin (1835-1920), Russian explorer of Inner Asia.

References 

potanini
Taxa named by Solomon Herzenstein
Fish described in 1891